R'Bonney Nola Gabriel (born March 20, 1994) is an American fashion designer, model, and beauty queen who was crowned Miss Universe 2022, becoming the ninth delegate from the United States to win the title, as well as the oldest entrant to be crowned, surpassing Andrea Meza of Mexico. Gabriel was previously crowned as Miss USA 2022.

Early life and education 
R'Bonney Nola Gabriel was born in Houston, Texas to a Filipino father, Remigio Bonzon "R. Bon" Gabriel, and a white American mother, Dana Walker, who married in the Philippines. She grew up in Missouri City and later Friendswood, with three older brothers. Her father was born in the Philippines and is from Manila, later immigrating to Washington state at the age of 25, later receiving a degree in psychology at the University of Houston, opening a car repair shop. Her mother is from Beaumont, Texas. Gabriel graduated from the University of North Texas with a bachelor's degree in fashion design with a minor in fibers. She works as a designer creating eco-friendly clothing, and as a model. She has worked as a sewing instructor at a non-profit.

Pageantry
Her first foray into pageantry was when she joined Miss Kemah USA 2020, where she placed among the Top 5 finalists. She competed at Miss Texas USA 2021 as Miss Harris County and placed as first runner-up to Victoria Hinojosa of McAllen.

Miss USA 2022 

She won Miss Texas USA 2022 and went on to represent Texas at Miss USA 2022, wherein she was subsequently crowned as Miss USA 2022 becoming the first Miss USA of Filipino descent.

With her crowning, Gabriel became the second titleholder to come from Texas, after Chelsi Smith, to win the Miss Universe title. Smith was Miss Universe in 1995.

Controversy 
Following her crowning, allegations emerged that the competition had been rigged for Gabriel to win. It was claimed that Gabriel traveled to Nizuc Resort and Spa in Cancún weeks after Gabriel was crowned Miss Texas USA and was able to shoot promotional material, which the resort's Instagram account posted less than 24 hours after the final competition. Nizuc has become one of the pageant's sponsors since national director and Miss USA 2008 Crystle Stewart took over at the end of 2020 after Miss USA and Miss Teen USA were separated from the Miss Universe Organization. Both Gabriel and Miss Colorado USA Alexis Glover, were not included in the official Cancún retreat along with the rest of the contestants as Texas and Colorado had not yet crowned at the time of the retreat. In an interview with E! News, Gabriel refuted claims that the pageant was rigged. She stated, "I would never enter any pageant or any competition that I know I would win".

Miss Universe 2022

As Miss USA 2022, she represented the United States at the Miss Universe 2022 pageant. The final of the competition was held on January 14, 2023, at the New Orleans Morial Convention Center in New Orleans, Louisiana, after being postponed from late 2022 to January 2023 due to the 2022 FIFA World Cup. 

She was crowned Miss Universe 2022 by the outgoing titleholder Harnaaz Sandhu of India, making her the ninth American to win the beauty pageant. Her victory also made her the first representative from the United States to win Miss Universe since Olivia Culpo at Miss Universe 2012. She is also the first Miss Universe titleholder to be born and raised in the Greater Houston area. Additionally, she is also the second Asian American woman who won Miss Universe titleholder since Brook Lee at Miss Universe 1997 and also the oldest winner at 28 years old.

In her capacity as Miss Universe, Gabriel traveled to Indonesia, Malaysia, Thailand, Vietnam, and various cities within her home country, the United States.

Further reading

References

1994 births
Living people
American fashion designers
American women fashion designers
Miss USA winners
Miss Universe 2022 contestants
Miss Universe winners
People from Houston
University of North Texas alumni
American models of Filipino descent
Female models from Texas